This is a List of drafted Färjestad BK players, players who has been drafted in the NHL Entry Draft and played the season prior to the draft for Färjestad BK. Players are listed according to year of draft, and then by overall position drafted.

Drafted players

Footnotes

See also 
NHL Entry Draft

References 
EliteProspects.com

 NHL Entry Draft selections
Lists of players selected in the NHL Entry Draft